Solana is the Spanish word for the "sunny side" of a mount or valley. It may refer to:

Places 

 La Solana, a municipality in Castile-La Mancha, Spain
 Solana, Cagayan, a municipality in the Philippines
 Solana de Ávila, a municipality in Castile and León, Spain
 Solana de los Barros, a municipality in Badajoz, Extremadura, Spain
 Solana de Rioalmar, a municipality in Castile and León, Spain
 Solana del Pino, a village in Ciudad Real, Spain
 Solana, Florida, United States
 Solana State Forest, Minnesota United States; see List of Minnesota state forests
 Solana Beach, California, United States
 Solana Beach (Amtrak station), an Amtrak station in Solana Beach, California
 Solana, the main galaxy in the Ratchet & Clank series that Ratchet and Clank are from.
Solana Valley, a valley in Aragon, Spain

Other uses 
 Solana (surname)
 Solana (automobile), a Mexican cottage manufacturer of sporting cars
 Solana (blockchain platform)
 Solana, the female protagonist of the Pokémon Ranger video game
 Solána Imani Rowe (born 1989), American singer known professionally as SZA
The Groovy Girls doll line, by Manhattan Toy, features a doll named Solana

See also
 Solana Generating Station, a solar power plant in Arizona, United States
 Solano (disambiguation)